Sir Bertram Sydney Barnsdale Stevens  (2 January 1889 – 24 March 1973), also referred to as B. S. B. Stevens, was an Australian politician who served as the 25th Premier of New South Wales, in office from 1932 to 1939 as leader of the United Australia Party (UAP).

Stevens grew up in Sydney and was an accountant and public servant before entering politics. He was elected to the New South Wales Legislative Assembly at the 1927 state election, as a member of the Nationalist Party. In 1929, he was appointed state treasurer under Thomas Bavin, serving until his party lost the 1930 election. In 1932, Stevens was elected as the inaugural leader of the state branch of the UAP. He became premier later that year, following the dismissal of Labor's Jack Lang, and subsequently led his party to victory at the 1932, 1935, and 1938 elections. Stevens was ousted in 1939 and replaced by Alexander Mair. He made an abortive attempt to enter federal politics at the 1940 election, and thereafter played little part in public life.

Early life
Stevens was born on 2 January 1889 in Redfern, Sydney, New South Wales. He was the seventh surviving child of Sarah (née Barnsdale) and John Stevens; his father worked as a carpenter. Stevens attended the Fort Street Model School, leaving in 1905 to work as a clerk for the Sydney Municipal Council. As a young man he served as a Methodist lay preacher; he kept teetotal and did not smoke. After training as an accountant, Stevens was appointed deputy town clerk of Manly in 1908, and then in 1912 became a clerk in the Department of Local Government. He married Edith Lillie Anderson on 18 April 1914, with whom he had three children. By 1920, Stevens was working as an inspector for the Public Service Board. He was appointed under-secretary and director of finance at the New South Wales Treasury in 1924. However, he soon came into conflict with Premier Jack Lang and resigned his position the following year. His resignation made him a public figure, and in 1927 he was elected to the Marrickville Council.

Political career
In 1927 Stevens entered the Legislative Assembly, as member for the Sydney suburban electoral district of Croydon. During the Nationalist Party Premiership of Sir Thomas Bavin, Stevens served first as Assistant Treasurer, and from 1929 as Treasurer. Not long after the Great Depression ended Bavin's administration in 1930, Stevens became Deputy Leader of the Opposition. In 1932 the Nationalist Party was absorbed into the United Australia Party, and Stevens became that party's state parliamentary leader.

Premier of New South Wales
In May 1932 the Governor Sir Philip Game, citing the reserve powers of The Crown, dismissed the government of Labor Premier Jack Lang, which was in dispute with Australia's federal government of James Scullin, and appointed Stevens as caretaker Premier. Stevens immediately called a state election, which his party won in a commanding landslide.

His major reform was the replacement of the appointed Legislative Council, by a Council elected by the whole parliament to terms equivalent to four Assembly terms, that is up to 12 years; this was passed by referendum in 1933. He reduced the protections for mortgagors and tenants that had been introduced by Lang's 1925–27 government. The UAP was re-elected (by somewhat reduced majorities) in 1935 and 1938, each time against the Lang-led Labor Party. For most of Stevens's seven-year Premiership, one of the longest in New South Wales history – it continued until the eve of World War II – he was his own Treasurer.

Stevens disliked the restrictive aspects of the Premiers' Plan, and was seen as overly parochial in his dealings with other states and the federal government. In a November 1932 letter to Stanley Bruce, Prime Minister Joseph Lyons wrote "We have got rid of Lang but unfortunately we now have a Stevens to contend with. At least one could go out and attack Lang in the open. In the case of Stevens, however, one is continually sabotaged from behind."

Although Stevens's dealings with Country Party leader and Deputy Premier Michael Bruxner were friendly, the same was not true of his working relationship with the United Australia Party's deputy leaders. In 1935 Stevens dropped Deputy leader Reginald Weaver from the ministry, describing him as "too extreme in personal independence" and possessing a "needlessly sharp tongue", Weaver was replaced as deputy by Eric Spooner. Spooner was critical of Stevens' relationship with the Country Party and in 1938 he was passed over as Treasurer. In July 1939, Spooner resigned from cabinet and on 1 August moved a motion that was critical of the proposal to cut government spending in order to restrain a growing deficit, with Spooner personally attacking Stevens, describing him as running the party as a dictatorship. The coalition had a large majority in the assembly, however the motion was passed 43 to 41, with nine United Australia members joining Spooner in voting against the government. Having lost the confidence of the assembly, Stevens resigned as Premier and leader of the party. Spooner's ambitions to replace Stevens as leader were thwarted as Bruxner refused to join a coalition with him and Alexander Mair succeeded Stevens as Premier.

Federal politics
Still only 50 years old when he lost the premiership, Stevens had long had hopes of a career in the federal parliament. Prime Minister Joseph Lyons had no clear successor, and within New South Wales many thought Stevens would be a suitable replacement; he had little support in other states, however. Despite Robert Menzies's attempts to discourage him, he abandoned his Assembly seat in 1940 and ran for the Labor-controlled Division of Lang during that year's federal election. He was easily defeated by the ALP incumbent, Dan Mulcahy.

Later life
In 1941 and 1942, Stevens served as the Australian representative to the Eastern Group Supply Council in New Delhi. After the war, Stevens was president of the India League of Australia, and wrote prolifically upon Indian politics; but he never again held, or sought, elective office. He died in the Sydney suburb of Concord West, poor as a result of a long public service career and almost forgotten, survived by a son and two daughters. Stevens was accorded a state funeral and buried beside his wife who pre-deceased him in 1966 at Pine Grove Memorial Park, Minchinbury, New South Wales.

Honours
 Stevens was made a Knight Commander of the Order of St Michael and St George in 1941.
 Sir Bertram Stevens Drive, a main access road through Royal National Park, a protected national park in Sutherland Shire, NSW.

See also
First Stevens–Bruxner ministry
Second Stevens–Bruxner ministry
Third Stevens–Bruxner ministry

References
Notes

Citations

External links

 
 

1889 births
1973 deaths
Australian accountants
Australian public servants
New South Wales local councillors
United Australia Party members of the Parliament of New South Wales
Members of the New South Wales Legislative Assembly
Premiers of New South Wales
Australian Knights Commander of the Order of St Michael and St George
Australian politicians awarded knighthoods
Leaders of the Opposition in New South Wales
Treasurers of New South Wales
Nationalist Party of Australia members of the Parliament of New South Wales
20th-century Australian politicians